The Rocket Festival was a three-day festival of music, circus, performance art and sculpture set in Andalucia in southern Spain that was held in May 2005, 2006 and 2008.

The festival evolved from the free festival movement in the UK and inspired by events such as Glastonbury Festival  and Shambala Festival.

The organisers have a long history in the UK festival and free party scene from Stonehenge to Glastonbury. The Rocket was conceived as a melting-pot of this alternative festival culture with the Spanish fiesta spirit set in a rural location near Alhama de Granada, Andalucia.

Rocket festivals
 29/04/2005 - 31/04/2005 in a rugged valley in the Sierra de Camorolos near Antequera, 50 km north of Málaga featuring Amparanoia and The Freestylers
 18/05/2006 - 20/05/2006 at the Finca de Los Morales, near Alhama de Granada, Granada, Spain featuring Eskorzo and Dreadzone
 16/05/2008 - 10/05/2008 at the same site as 2006 near Alhama de Granada, Granada, Spain featuring Coldcut, Pendulum, Evil Nine, The Nextmen, Muchachito Bombo Infierno, and Los Delinqüentes

External links
Rocket Festival official website

References

Music festivals in Spain
Counterculture festivals